Eric Londesbrough Dalton (2 December 1906 – 3 June 1981) was a South African cricketer who played in 15 Test matches from 1929 to 1938–39.  He was born and died in Durban, Natal.

In a match against Tasmania during the 1931–32 South African tour of Australia, Dalton had his jaw broken by a bouncer from Laurie Nash, who was on a hat-trick at the time.

In 1935, Dalton was a member of the South African team that won a Test match in England for the first time. During the match at Lord's, although not especially noted for his bowling, he took the key wickets of Wally Hammond and captain Bob Wyatt in England's first innings to return figures of 2 for 33. In the final Test at The Oval, he scored 117 runs in the first innings, his highest Test score, and 57 not out in the second as the match was drawn, The result gave South Africa their first Test series victory in England.

After his cricket career ended he concentrated on golf. He won the South African Amateur Championship in 1950 and represented South Africa in the first Commonwealth Tournament at St Andrew's in 1954. He was also adept at several other sports, including bowls, tennis and table tennis, and had a keen interest in music, playing the piano and singing baritone.

References

1906 births
1981 deaths
KwaZulu-Natal cricketers
South Africa Test cricketers
South African male golfers
Amateur golfers
South African cricketers